Michele Vaccaro (Agrigento, 21 December 1887 – Rome, 1980) was an Italian general during World War II.

Biography

He was born in Agrigento on 21 December 1887, the son of Alfonso Vaccaro and Giuseppina Lupo, and after enlisting in the Royal Italian Army he was commissioned as infantry second lieutenant on 21 October 1909. He fought in Libya during the Italo-Turkish War and the First Italo-Senussi War with the 57th Infantry Regiment "Abruzzi", earning a Silver Medal of Military Valor for having distinguished himself in the battle of Ettangi (Cyrenaica) on 18 June 1913. From 1915 he took part in the First World War in the ranks of the 71st Infantry Regiment of the "Puglie" Infantry Brigade, earning another Silver Medal for having saved the life of his regimental commander on the Hermada on 4 June 1917 and being promoted to the rank of major in the same year. In 1916 he had a son, Giuseppe (who would also pursue a military career, eventually becoming general and commander of Allied Forces Southern Europe from 1977 to 1979). 

After the war he remained in service at the 71st Infantry Regiment in Venice (where he was also judge at the local military tribunal) until on 1 March 1923 he was assigned to the 59th Infantry Regiment "Calabria", stationed in Sardinia, being promoted to lieutenant colonel on February 2, 1927. From 11 June 1933 he was in service at the Central Infantry School in Rome and then at the Ministry of War until 15 February 1937, when he became commander of the 23rd Infantry Regiment "Como" in Gorizia, remaining there until late 1939. After a period at the VIII Army Corps in Rome, from 28 June 1940 to February 1942 he commanded the Central Infantry School.

On 1 January 1942 he was promoted to brigadier general, and in the summer of 1942 he was placed in command of the infantry of the 2nd Infantry Division "Sforzesca", then under the command of General Carlo Pellegrini, on the Eastern Front, deployed on the Don river. In August 1942 he received his third Silver Medal for his role in repelling a Soviet attack on the Don. After Operation Little Saturn and the subsequent general retreat of the 8th Army, from 15 February 1943 he had the interim command of the depleted "Sforzesca", with which he returned to Italy and was stationed in the Julian March, between Sezana and Ilirska Bistrica, where in June 1943 the "Sforzesca" was merged with the 157th Infantry Division "Novara". After the armistice of Cassibile he was captured by the Germans in Fiume and interned in Oflag 64/Z in Schokken until he accepted to pledge allegiance to the Italian Social Republic and was therefore repatriated. He did not, however, take any active role within the RSI. He died in Rome in 1980.

References

1887 births
1980 deaths
Italian generals
Italian military personnel of World War II
Italian military personnel of World War I
Italian military personnel of the Italo-Turkish War
Recipients of the Silver Medal of Military Valor

it:Michele Vaccaro